Russell Howard Tuttle (born August 18, 1939) is a distinguished primate morphologist, paleoanthropologist, and a four-field (linguistics, archaeology, sociocultural anthropology and biological anthropology) trained Anthropologist. He is currently an active Professor of Anthropology, Evolutionary Biology, History of Science and Medicine at the University of Chicago. Tuttle was enlisted by Mary Leakey to analyze the 3.4-million-year-old footprints she discovered in Laetoli, Tanzania. He determined that the creatures that left these prints walked bipedally in a fashion almost identical to human beings. He currently lives in Chicago, Illinois.

Tuttle was named Guggenheim Fellow in 1985 and a Fellow of the American Association for the Advancement of Science (AAAS) in 2003.

References

External links
Biography at University of Chicago Anthropology Department
"Bio-History in the Anthropocene: Interdisciplinary Study on the Past and Present of Human Life" Kyle Harper, Lynn K. Nyhart, Jonathan Lyon, Joanna Radin, Julia A. Thomas, Russell H. Tuttle. Chicago Journal of History Vol-VII Autumn 2016.

1939 births
Living people
American anthropologists
21st-century American biologists
American paleoanthropologists
Fellows of the American Association for the Advancement of Science
People from Chicago